Adolf Peter Rading (2 February 1888, in Berlin – 4 April 1957, in London) was a German architect of the Neues Bauen period, also active in Palestine and Great Britain.

Career

After finishing architecture school in Berlin, Rading briefly worked in the office of Peter Behrens in 1919.  That same year he moved to Breslau, becoming a professor at the National Academy for Arts and Crafts.  In 1926 Rading established a partnership with Hans Scharoun, became a member of The Ring (the architectural collective), and in 1927 contributed a single-family house to the Weissenhof Estate exhibition.  

After the Nazis came to power in 1933, Rading, whose wife came from a Jewish family, emigrated to France and then to Palestine, in today's Israel.  From 1943 through 1950 Rading served as the city architect of Haifa; in 1950 he established himself in Great Britain.

References

1888 births
1957 deaths
20th-century German architects
Architects from Berlin